Air India Express Flight 611 was an international flight from Tiruchirappalli, India, to Dubai, United Arab Emirates. On 11 October 2018, the Boeing 737-800, registration VT-AYD, operating the flight suffered a severe tail strike and crashed into the localizer antenna and perimeter wall, due to the captain's backrest collapsing on takeoff. The aircraft continued to fly towards the UAE. When it was nearing Oman, it was diverted to Mumbai, India, where it landed safely.

Incident
Conditions were good, and the captain choose to take off from Runway 27. ATC granted Flight 611 takeoff clearance at 00:49 hours. The thrust was set to 98% for takeoff, and as is standard procedure, the captain placed his hand on the thrust levers ready to pull them closed in case of a rejected takeoff. That caused him to inadvertently pull the thrust levers back, reducing thrust from 98% to 77%. The captain immediately called "your controls", giving the first officer control of the aircraft. Due to the sudden and unprecedented problem, the first officer failed to confirm the position of the thrust levers, a mandatory step if a pilot becomes incapacitated. However, during the takeoff, the aircraft collided with the airport fence, an ILS antenna, and a brick wall. A motorist passing the brick wall was struck by debris and injured.

Once airborne, both pilots realized the aircraft was vibrating, which they attributed to wake turbulence and did nothing. Cabin crew at the rear of the aircraft felt a bump during takeoff and relayed that observation to the senior cabin crew at the first opportunity, although they believed the noise was caused by cargo moving. At the Trichy ATC Tower, operators become aware that the ILS Localizer was no longer working. Tower staff dispatched a crew to inspect the antenna, who discovered that it had been destroyed and that the one and a half meter-tall boundary wall had sustained significant damage, with parts of the aircraft skin embedded. The damage was found to be from the landing gear.

Flight 611 crew were informed of that by ATC at 00:56 but, inexplicably, decided to proceed with the flight, in violation of the tailstrike protocol, which states that the aircraft must not be pressurized and must land at the nearest available airport. The crew maintained an altitude of  while testing the landing gear and other systems. Whilst the flight carried on towards Dubai, an Air India Express representative attended  Tiruchirappalli Airport and inspected the damage done. Shortly thereafter, the company contacted the flight crew and instructed them to divert to Mumbai, despite the stricken aircraft being much closer to Dubai. Flight 611 touched down safely at Mumbai Airport at 05:38 hours, with the emergency services standing by.

After the aircraft had parked at a stand, an inspection found a large hole in the underside of the plane, with a light and VHF antenna having been ripped off, as well as damage to the landing gear, the left horizontal stabilizer, and the cowling of the number two engine.

Investigation
The subsequent investigation found that the collapse of the captain's backrest was due to over-tightening of the reclining mechanism. The investigation also found that had the first officer implemented a rejected takeoff, the aircraft would have had sufficient runway to come to a stop safely. Had either the first officer or captain increased thrust back to 98%, Flight 611 would have taken off safely.

See also
 Emirates Flight 407 - a tailstrike caused by too little thrust on takeoff.

References

External links

Aviation accidents and incidents in 2018
Aviation accidents and incidents in India
October 2018 events in India
Air India accidents and incidents
2018 in Tamil Nadu
Accidents and incidents involving the Boeing 737 Next Generation